Ahmad ibn Ibrahim al-Ghazi (Harari: አሕመድ ኢብራሂም አል-ጋዚ,  ;  1506 – 21 February 1543) was an imam and general of the Adal Sultanate. Imam Ahmad (commonly named Ahmed Gurey in Somali, and Gura in Afar, both meaning "the left-handed" or "the southpaw"), invaded the Ethiopian Empire under the Sultanate of Adal during the Ethiopian-Adal War.

Ethnicity
Imam Ahmad is regarded by most scholars as an ethnic Somali. However, a few historians have dismissed the Somali theory. Merid Wolde Aregay argued Ahmed ibn Ibrahim al-Ghazi belonged to the Harla dynasty of rulers through his father. Mohammed Hassan also states Ahmed was the son of Garad Ibrahim, a provincial governor of Sim in Harla realm. According to Taddesse Tamrat, although various Somali clans were involved in the conquest, Ahmed was not a Somali and had links to the Semitic-speaking Wâlasma aristocracy. Some sources assert Ahmad was Harari (commonly interchangeable with the Harla, as the Harari was found by seven Harla subclans), while others regard him as Afar or Argobba.

Many Somali clans played a strong role in Gurey's conquest of Abyssinia, however, it is said that these clans went to war not so much as Somalis but as Muslims.  In the Futuh al-Habasa of Sihab ad-Din records that when the Sultan Umar Din of Harar and the Imam quarrelled over the distribution of the alms tax at some point between the Battle of Shimbra Kure and the Battle of Amba Sel, it led to Imam Ahmad leaving Harar to retire to live amongst Somalis for some time and regularly mediated disputes between clans

Historian Whiteway, R. S. (Richard Stephen) based on the accounts of the Portuguese expeditions to Abyssinia had this much to say about Imam Ahmad's background:

Of the early history of the Imam Ahmad but little is known. He was the son of one Ibrahim el Ghazi, and both he and his father were common soldiers in the troop of Garad Aboun. Nothing even is said as to his nationality. He was certainly not an Arab: probably he was a Somali, for we find him closely connected with many who were Somalis.

Patrick Gikes however states:

I. M. Lewis discusses the existence of another leader named Ahmad Gurey, and suggests that the two leaders have been conflated into one historical figure:The text refers to two Ahmad's with the nickname 'Left-handed'. One is regularly presented as 'Ahmad Guray, the Somali' (...) identified as Ahmad Gurey Huseyn, chief of the Habar Magaadle. Another reference, however, appears to link the Habar Magadle with the Eidagale. The other Ahmad is simply referred to as 'Imam Ahmad' or simply the 'Imam'. This Ahmad is not qualified by the adjective Somali (...) The two Ahmads have been conflated into one figure, the heroic Ahmed Guray

The leading historian of Ethiopia, former Minister of Education, Arts & Culture and Dean of the National Library under Haile Selassie, Takla Sadiq Mekuria, devoted a 950-page book to the question of origin of Gragn and the identity of the Malassay in his rough monograph on the Gragn Wars (1961) called "Ya Gragn Warara" (The Conquests of Gragn), in it he draws on the evidence from Arab Faqih Sihab Uddin and the chronicles of Sarsa-Dengel. This book had to be approved directly by Emperor Haile Selassie, as mentioned in the introduction. Through the mediation of Dagazmac Wargnah he interviewed Ahmed Ali Shami, the highest authoritative scholar of Harar that produced the concise manuscript history of Harar (in his Fatah Madinat Harar manuscript) for several European institutions and concludes Gragn's father was to come from the Hawiye (Somali clan) in the Ogaden; a genealogy of eight generations before Gragn is known in this tradition.

Early years

Imam Ahmad was born in 1506 at Hubat or Zeila, in the Adal Sultanate. Ahmad spent most of his childhood in the city of Harar. Due to the un-Islamic rule during the reign of Sultan Abu Bakr ibn Muhammad, Ahmad would leave Harar for Hubat. In Hubat an uprising Adashe crowned himself Sultan of the inhabitants. Adashe longed for Harar and quickly started his conquest after gaining respect from the people. Ahmed along with his father joined Adashe in his conquest and joined the ranks of the elite Adalite force, and became the elite infantryman of Hubat. Adashe who was the uncle of Gragn revolted against the rulers of Zeila and attacked several Adal strong holds, Adashe was then made sultan of Adal for seven years which was his greatest achievement. His rule over Zeila (Adal) wouldn't last long because a sultan by the name of Abu Bakr ibn Muhammed rebelled. Abu Bakr was defeated Adashe and killed Adashe near Harar. Abu bakr then established  himself at Harar. When Abu Bakr became sultan the whole country  turned against him because Adashe was a kind man and even his arch enemies loved him. Many people joined the forces of Ahmed Gragn because he claimed to avenge his masters death and kill Abu Bakr. Abu Bakr waged war against Ahmed; however, Ahmed killed Abu Bakr and became the sultan of Adal.

He married Bati del Wambara, the daughter of Mahfuz, the Governor of Zeila. In 1531, Bati would give birth to their first child named Muhammad.

When Mahfuz was killed returning from a campaign against the Abyssinian emperor Dawit II in 1517, the Adal sultanate lapsed into anarchy for several years, until Imam Ahmad killed the last of the contenders for power and took control of Harar.

Ethiopian historians such as Azazh T'ino and Bahrey have written that during the period of his rise to power, Ahmad ibn Ibrahim al-Ghazi had converted many Oromo pastoral people to Islam.

In retaliation for an attack on Adal the previous year by the Abyssinian general Degalhan, Imam Ahmad invaded Abyssinia in 1529, supplementing his force with considerable numbers of muskets purchased from the Ottomans, which would panic the Abyssinian troops. Imam Ahmad maintained the discipline of most of his men, defeating Emperor Dawit II at Shimbra Kure that March.

Invasion of Abyssinia

The chronicle of Imam Ahmad's invasion of Abyssinia is depicted in various Somali, Abyssinian and other foreign sources. Ahmed with the help of an army overwhelmingly manned by ethnic Somalis or Harla/Harari invaded Ethiopia. Imam Ahmad campaigned in Abyssinia in 1531, breaking Emperor Dawit II ability to resist in the Battle of Amba Sel on 28 October. The Muslim army of Imam Ahmad then marched northward to loot the island monastery of Lake Hayq and the stone churches of Lalibela. When the Imam entered the province of Tigray, he defeated an Abyssinian army that confronted him there. On reaching Axum, he destroyed the Church of Our Lady Mary of Zion.

The Abyssinians were forced to ask for help from the Portuguese, who landed at the port of Massawa on 10 February 1541, during the reign of the emperor Gelawdewos. The force was led by Cristóvão da Gama and included 400 musketeers as well as a number of artisans and other non-combatants. Da Gama and Imam Ahmad met on 1 April 1542 at Jarte, which Trimingham has identified with Anasa, between Amba Alagi and Lake Ashenge. Here the Portuguese had their first glimpse of Ahmad, as recorded by Castanhoso:

While his camp was being pitched, the king of Zeila [Imam Ahmad] ascended a hill with several horse and some foot to examine us: he halted on the top with three hundred horse and three large banners, two white with red moons, and one red with a white moon, which always accompanied him, and [by] which he was recognized.

On 4 April, after the two unfamiliar armies had exchanged messages and stared at each other for a few days, da Gama formed his troops into an infantry square and marched against the Imam's lines, repelling successive waves of Muslim attacks with musket and cannon. This battle ended when Imam Ahmad was wounded in the leg by a chance shot; seeing his banners signal retreat, the Portuguese and their Abyssinian allies fell upon the disorganized Muslims, who suffered losses but managed to reform next to the river on the distant side.

Over the next several days, Imam Ahmad's forces were reinforced by arrivals of fresh troops.  Understanding the need to act swiftly, da Gama on April 16 again formed a square which he led against Imam Ahmad's camp.  Castanhoso laments that "the victory would have been complete this day had we only one hundred horses to finish it: for the King was carried on men's shoulders in a bed, accompanied by horsemen, and they fled in no order."

Reinforced by the arrival of the Bahr Negus Yeshaq, da Gama marched southward after Imam Ahmad's force, coming within sight of him ten days later. However, the onset of the rainy season prevented da Gama from engaging Ahmad a third time.  On the advice of Queen Seble Wongel, da Gama made winter camp at Wofla near Lake Ashenge, still within sight of his opponent, while the Imam made his winter camp on Mount Zobil.

The Imam was forced to ask for help. According to Abbé , Imam Ahmad received 2000 musketeers from Arabia, and artillery and 900 picked men from the Ottomans to assist him. Meanwhile, due to casualties and other duties, da Gama's force was reduced to 300 musketeers. After the rains ended, Imam Ahmad attacked the Portuguese camp and through weight of numbers killed all but 140 of da Gama's troops. Da Gama himself, badly wounded, was captured with ten of his men and, after refusing an offer to spare his life if he would convert to Islam, was executed.

The survivors and Emperor Gelawdewos were afterward able to join forces and, drawing on the Portuguese supplies of muskets, attacked Ahmad on 21 February 1543 in the Battle of Wayna Daga, where their vastly outnumbered troops of 9,000 managed to defeat the 15,000 soldiers under Gragn. The Imam was mortally wounded by a Portuguese musketeer during the battle.

His wife Bati del Wambara managed to escape the battlefield with a remnant of the soldiers, and they made their way back to Harar, where she rallied his followers. Intent on avenging her husband's death, she married his nephew Nur ibn Mujahid on condition that Nur would avenge Imam Ahmad's defeat. In 1550, Nur departed on a Jihad, or Holy War, in the eastern Abyssinian lowlands of Bale, and Hadiya but was repelled by Ras Fanu'el. Abyssinians launched a punitive expedition that captured vast amount of treasure and livestock and they sacked many towns including Harar. In 1559, he invaded Fatagar and Abyssinian Emperor Galawdewos launched a second punitive expedition but was killed in battle.

Legacy

"In Ethiopia the damage which Ahmad Gragn did has never been forgotten," wrote Paul B. Henze. "Every Christian highlander still hears tales of Gragn in his childhood. Haile Selassie referred to him in his memoirs, "I have often had villagers in northern Ethiopia point out sites of towns, forts, churches and monasteries destroyed by Gragn as if these catastrophes had occurred only yesterday." To most Somalis Ahmad is a national hero who fought against Abyssinian aggression on their ancient territories.

Further reading
Ahmad's invasion of Abyssinia is described in detail in the Futuh al-habaša ("The Conquest of Ethiopia"), written in Arabic by Ahmad's follower Sihab ad-Din Admad ibn 'Abd-al-Qadir, in its current version incomplete, covering the story only to 1537, narrating the Imam's raids on the islands of Lake Tana. Richard Burton the explorer claimed that the second part could be found "in Mocha or Hudaydah"; but, despite later investigation, no one else has reported seeing a copy of this second part. The surviving first part was translated into French by René Basset and published from 1897 to 1901. Richard Pankhurst made a partial translation into English as part of his The Ethiopian Royal Chronicles (Addis Ababa: Oxford University Press, 1967), and a complete translation of the Futuh al-habaša by Paul Lester Stenhouse was published by Tsehai in 2003.

 (collection of primary sources on the Portuguese expedition in English translation)

See also
Imam Ahmed Stadium
Adal Sultanate
History of Medieval Somalia
History of Ethiopia
List of Somalis

References

External links
The Ethiopian Muslim and Christian War (1528-1560)
Somalia: From The Dawn of Civilization To The Modern Times: Chapter 8: Somali Hero - Ahmad Gurey (1506-43)

Somali monarchs
1500s births
1543 deaths
Somalian military leaders
Somalian imams
People from the Adal Sultanate
16th-century Somalian people